Albert Putt (13 March 1927 – 13 July 2007) was a New Zealand cricketer. He played two first-class matches for Auckland between 1947 and 1951.

See also
 List of Auckland representative cricketers

References

External links
 

1927 births
2007 deaths
New Zealand cricketers
Auckland cricketers
Cricketers from Auckland